The 83rd Assembly District of Wisconsin is one of 99 districts in the Wisconsin State Assembly. It includes the city of Mukwonago and the northern half of the city of Muskego, as well as the villages of Big Bend, Eagle, East Troy, and Waterford. The district is represented by Republican Nik Rettinger, since January 2023.

The 83rd Assembly District is located within Wisconsin's 28th Senate district, along with the 82nd and 84th Assembly districts.

History

Notable former representatives of the 83rd district include John C. Shabaz, who was appointed United States district judge for the Western District of Wisconsin by President Ronald Reagan and later became chief judge of that court.

List of past representatives

References 

Wisconsin State Assembly districts
Milwaukee County, Wisconsin
Racine County, Wisconsin
Walworth County, Wisconsin
Waukesha County, Wisconsin